"New York" is a song by English recording artist Paloma Faith from her debut studio album Do You Want the Truth or Something Beautiful? (2009). It was released on 13 September 2009. The song features a sweeping gospel chorus by the London-based Souls of Prophecy Gospel Choir.
The song was re-released in a new remix featuring rapper Ghostface Killah.

Critical reception
BBC chart blog gave the song a more positive review than her previous single and rewarded it with 4 stars.

Digital Spy gave the song 3/5 stars and a less positive rating than Stone Cold Sober: 'New York', Faith's follow-up, is a rather more straightforward offering than its predecessor. The lyrics tell the tale of a girl who loses a guy to "another lady", but sadly for Paloma the lass in question isn't a flesh-and-blood adversary, but actually the Big Apple. It's a much bigger target of course, but one that's harder to hit with a swinging vintage handbag. Despite its sweeping strings and soaring vocals, 'New York' is a shade unremarkable compared to her debut, but it still manages to whet the appetite for Faith's upcoming album.

Chart performance
New York is Faith's fourth most successful single to date, behind "Only Love Can Hurt Like This" "Picking Up the Pieces" and "Can't Rely on You" charting in the top forty in six different countries. The song debuted on the UK Singles Chart at 21, the following week, it fell to 31, then rose 16 places to 15 on its third week, which became its peak position. It stayed eleven weeks in the UK chart.

The song had moderate success elsewhere, reaching number 54 in Germany, 12 in Ireland, 13 in Switzerland, 8 in Finland, 29 in Denmark and number 28 in Sweden.

Music video
The music video was shot at a London bowling alley and features professional bowlers. The director was Vaughan Arnell, who also directed the video to Robbie Williams' song, Bodies. The video was released on 2 August 2009.

Track listing
Digital download

Charts and certifications

End-of-year charts

Certifications

Release history

Re-release

In June 2010, Faith announced that she would release a new remix of the song featuring an appearance from American rapper Ghostface Killah. The song was released on 1 August 2010.

Critical reception
The remix received mixed responses, many critics said that the song has been ruined by the rap. In 2012, Faith remarked that she thought the collaboration with Ghostface Killah was unnecessary, and that she felt he did not know what the song was about when he wrote the rap accompaniment.

Charts performance
Due to the lack of airplay, the song entered the UK Singles Chart at 82 on 7 August 2010. However it then climbed to 44 in its second week on the chart. The original was played on radio during the re-release of this track. It spent five weeks on the chart.

Track listing
Digital download

Charts

References

2009 singles
Paloma Faith songs
Songs about New York City
Songs written by Paloma Faith
2009 songs
Epic Records singles
Songs written by Jodi Marr
Music videos directed by Vaughan Arnell
Songs written by Ghostface Killah